Liba may refer to:

People
 Igor Liba (born 1960), Slovak ice hockey player
 Liba Taub (born 1954), American historian
 Peter Liba (1940–2007), Canadian journalist and politician
  (born 1977), Israeli actor

Places
 
 Libá, Czech Republic

Other
 Liba or Spondias, flowering plant
 Loyola Institute of Business Administration